James Stephen Golden (September 20, 1891 – September 6, 1971) was a U.S. Representative from Kentucky.

Born in Barbourville, Kentucky, Golden attended grade school in Barbourville and high school at Union College, Barbourville, Kentucky.
He attended the University of Kentucky at Lexington, receiving the A.B., 1912 and then got his law degree from the law school of the University of Michigan at Ann Arbor, LL.B., 1916.
He was admitted to the bar in 1916 and commenced the practice of law in Barbourville, Kentucky, the same year.

Golden was elected county attorney of Knox County, Kentucky, in 1918 and served until 1922.
He served as delegate to the Republican National Convention in 1952.

Golden was elected as a Republican to the Eighty-first and to the two succeeding Congresses (January 3, 1949 – January 3, 1955).
He was not a candidate for renomination in 1954 to the Eighty-fourth Congress.
He resumed the practice of law.
He died in Pineville, Kentucky, September 6, 1971.
He was interred in Pineville Memorial Cemetery.

References 

1891 births
1971 deaths
American prosecutors
Kentucky lawyers
People from Barbourville, Kentucky
University of Michigan Law School alumni
Republican Party members of the United States House of Representatives from Kentucky
20th-century American politicians
20th-century American lawyers